Snow Man is a Japanese idol boy band formed by Johnny & Associates in 2012. The group was previously a sub-unit of Johnny & Associates' pre-debut trainee group, Johnny's Jr. The group's activities focused on acrobats and stage play. Along with SixTONES, Snow Man made their official debut on 22 January 2020. The group's simultaneous debut marks the first time for two groups to debut on the same day in Johnny's history.

Snow Man makes the best selling debut group since KAT-TUN in 2006. D.D./Imitation Rain is the best-selling debut release in Asian history with more than 1.8 million physical copies sold, it is also the first male idol single in 17 years to reach the top 100 of the Oricon chart for more than 100 weeks. Since their debut in 2020 the group sold 11 million physical copies in Japan. In 2021, their debut studio album, Snow Mania S1, sold in the first week more than 841k physical copies, and became in the best selling first week for a boygroup studio album in Japan history, and in the second best week for a debut album in the country history. Their single Grandeur was the best-selling release of 2021 in Japan with more than 1 million physical copies sold, with this Snow Man became the first male artist since L'Arc~en~Ciel in 1999 to have two consecutive years a release that sells more than a million copies.

In January 2022, Snow Man moved from label Avex Trax to MENT Recording. MENT Recording is a newly established joint label between Avex Entertainment and Johnny & Associates. Other Johnny's group under Avex Trax, Kis-My-Ft2, moved to MENT Recording as well.

History
The group was predeceased by Mis Snow Man, a unit formed in 2009 that consists of 9 people. The group has been active in stage play series Takizawa Kabuki since 2010. Among them, a unit consists of Tatsuya Fukazawa, Daisuke Sakuma, Shota Watanabe, Ryota Miyadate, Hikaru Iwamoto, and Ryohei Abe was later formed on May 3, 2012. The group's new name, Snow Man, was first announced when the six men stood in the stage of Takizawa Kabuki 2012, when letters suddenly appeared on the big screen behind them. The group's name was officially announced both to them and audience as a surprise.

While active as back dancers for Tackey & Tsubasa, Kis-My-Ft2, A.B.C-Z, and other senior groups, they also regularly appeared in stage plays Dream Boys and Takizawa Kabuki, and from 2015, Shonen-tachi and its movie version. Since all of them are good at acrobatics, they are sometimes referred as "the craftsman group" and are often nominated by seniors in Johnny's as "Johnny's Jr. members they want to have as back dancers." While has been always described as "the best dancer among Johnny's Jr." since their formation in 2012 and despite their appearances in theater, the group couldn't get the chance to get a debut, leading to its member to "having a thought of leaving several times."  In January 2019, Raul from Shonen Ninja, Ren Meguro from Uchuu Six, and a member from Kansai Johnny's Jr. Koji Mukai, was added as new members. While the original 6 members accepted the decision as "they wanted to protect the group," they also felt that the "even if whole group (as original Snow Man) has gone, we just want to realize our dream as Snow Man," and "the only way to get rid of this problem (off my head) is this."

In March 2019, the group, along with 11 other Johnny's Jr. groups (SixTones, Travis Japan, HiHi Jets, Bi Shonen, 7 Men Samurai, Shonen Ninja, Jr.SP, Uchuu Six, Naniwa Danshi, Lil Kansai, and Ae! group) become a part of Island TV, a website that provides video streaming exclusive for Johnny's Jr. members.

The group's debut was first announced by Takizawa, who is told by Johnny Kitagawa in his hospital bed in June 2019. Debuting at the same time as SixTONES, the announcement was officially announced in Johnny's Jr. 8.8 Matsuri ~Tokyo Dome kara Hajimaru~ concert on August 8, 2019. They also "graduated" from Johhny's Jr. official YouTube channel and officially opened their own YouTube channel on December 25, 2019.

Post debut 
On February 1, 2020, the group marked their first overseas appearance in Japan Expo Thailand 2020. Their Asia tour titled Snow Man ASIA TOUR 2D.2D in Kanagawa Prefecture, Osaka, and Tokyo, as well as overseas live in Bangkok, Singapore, Jakarta, and Taipei had to be cancelled due to COVID-19.

In March 2020, the group received their own television show titled . The show's was revealed as a surprise to Snow Man through their YouTube channel in February 2020. The show first ran from March 25, 2020, on TBS. However, later in the same month, Hikaru Iwamoto was reported to be taking a break from the group's activities after the Japanese magazine Friday published a report of him drinking at love motel in 2017. Through Johnny's apology post, it was written that Iwamoto confirmed that an underage girl was among those present. The other 8 members also made their apology in their appearance at the live music program CDTV Live! Live! on the same day as the reported news. On July 1, Johnny's net and Johnny's web announced that Iwamoto will be back to resume his activities.

In April 2020, the group performed the 11th opening theme song for the anime Black Clover, titled "Stories."

In May 2020, Snow Man was announced to be a part of Twenty★Twenty, a temporary unit consisting of 75 talents that have debuted in Johnny's, to perform a charity song. The unit was formed to help curb the spread of the novel coronavirus. The song, titled "Smile," is written by Kazutoshi Sakurai and is produced by Hideaki Takizawa.

A movie version of stage play Takizawa Kabuki called Takizawa Kabuki Zero The Movie (滝沢歌舞伎 ZERO The Movie) was released on December 5, 2020 starring the members of Snow Man in the main roles. This marks Snow Man's post-debut first main role in a movie.

In December 2020, it was announced that Ryota Miyadate had tested positive for COVID-19. Their New Years performance was canceled as a result.

On January 5, 2021, Snow Man's song "Grandeur" debuted as the 13th Opening for Black Clover.

In April 2021, it was reported that Daisuke Sakuma will voice the male lead of Chinese animated movie White Snake, Ah Xuan, in its Japanese dub version. This is Sakuma's second voice acting role after he debuted in Black Clover. The Japanese version of the movie also features a theme song by Snow Man, .

In August 2021, Snow Man was announced to star in the live action movie adaptation of anime series Mr. Osomatsu. Six of them will play as the Matsuno sextuplets while the rest, Ryōta Miyadate, Shōta Watanabe, and Ryōhei Abe, as the movie's original character, each named Period, End, and Close respectively. The film premiered on March 25, 2022. The group also provided the film's theme song "Brother Beat."

In the same month, the group announced their first album release titled Snow Mania S1. The album released on September 29, 2021. The first edition A of the album contains the highly requested group's pre-debut original songs, including "Make It Hot!" and "Owaranai Memories."

Members

 — leader

Discography

Studio albums

Video albums

Singles

Unreleased songs

2015
 Zig Zag Love

2016
 Acrobatic

2017
 Boogie Woogie Baby
 VI Guys Snow Man
 Vanishing Over

2018
 Snow Dream
 Party! Party! Party!
 Don't Hold Back

2019
 Make It Hot
 
 Lock On!
 
 Cry Out
 
 
 

2020 (post debut)
Black Gold
Be Proud! (2nd theme song for television program Sore Snow Man ni Yarasete Kudasai!)

Awards

Notes

References

External links
 Snow Man Official website - avex trax
 ISLAND TV > Snow Man

Japanese boy bands
Japanese idol groups